Group E of the EuroBasket 2013 took place between 11 to 15 September 2013. The group played all of its games at Arena Stožice in Ljubljana, Slovenia.

The group composed of the best three teams from Group A and B. The four best ranked teams advanced to the knockout stage.

Standings
|}

All times are local (UTC+2)

11 September

Latvia vs. Ukraine

Belgium vs. Serbia

Lithuania vs. France

13 September

Lithuania vs. Belgium

Ukraine vs. Serbia

France vs. Latvia

15 September

Latvia vs. Belgium

Ukraine vs. Lithuania

Serbia vs. France

External links
 Standings and fixtures

Group E
2013–14 in French basketball
2013–14 in Ukrainian basketball
2013–14 in Serbian basketball
2013–14 in Latvian basketball
2013–14 in Belgian basketball